Nikolaj Koch-Hansen (born 11 March 1986) is a Danish handball player, currently playing for Danish Handball League side FCK Håndbold. He is the younger brother of fellow FCK Handball player Sebastian Koch-Hansen.

External links
 Player info

1986 births
Living people
Danish male handball players